Ernie James Clement (born March 22, 1996) is an American professional baseball utility player in the Toronto Blue Jays organization. He has also played in Major League Baseball (MLB) for the Cleveland Indians / Guardians and Oakland Athletics.

Amateur career
Clement attended Brighton High School in Rochester, New York, where he played baseball and ice hockey. For his high school career, he hit .472. Undrafted out of high school in the 2014 MLB draft, he enrolled at the University of Virginia where he played college baseball.

In 2015, Clement's freshman year at Virginia, he played in 62 games (61 being starts), hitting .245 with one home run and 22 RBIs. He hit .292 in the 2015 College World Series and was named to the All-CWS Team, helping Virginia win their first ever national title. He spent the summer playing in the Northwoods League with the Wisconsin Rapids Rafters. As a sophomore at Virginia in 2017, he batted .351/383/.443 with one home run and thirty RBIs in sixty games (all starts), earning a spot on the All-Atlantic Coast Conference Third Team. In the summer of 2016, he played in the Cape Cod Baseball League for the Harwich Mariners where he was named the league's Most Valuable Player after hitting .353 with 59 hits in forty games. In 2016, his junior season with Virginia, he hit .315 with two home runs and 34 RBIs in 58 games, earning All-ACC Third Team honors for the second consecutive year. In 745 collegiate at-bats, Clement struck out only 31 times.

Professional career

Cleveland Indians / Guardians

Clement was selected by the Cleveland Indians in the fourth round of the 2017 MLB draft. He signed with Cleveland and made his professional debut with the Mahoning Valley Scrappers of the Class A Short Season New York–Penn League, hitting .280 with 13 RBIs in 45 games. He began 2018 with the Lake County Captains of the Class A Midwest League and was promoted to the Lynchburg Hillcats of the Class A-Advanced Carolina League and Akron RubberDucks of the Class AA Eastern League during the season. Over 102 total games between the three clubs, he slashed .289/.358/.375 with two home runs, 33 RBIs, and 18 stolen bases.

Clement returned to Akron to begin 2019, but missed a month during the season with an adductor strain. At the end of the year, he played in three games for the Columbus Clippers of the Class AAA International League. Over 101 games during the year, Clement batted .269/.323/.331 with one home run, 28 RBIs, and 17 stolen bases. He was selected to play in the Arizona Fall League for the Mesa Solar Sox following the season. Clement did not play a minor league game in 2020 due to the cancellation of the minor league season caused by the COVID-19 pandemic. The Indians added him to the 40-man roster on November 20, 2020. To begin the 2021 season, he returned to Columbus, now members of the newly-formed Triple-A East.

On May 30, 2021, Clement was promoted to the major leagues for the first time as the 27th man on the Indians' roster for the second game of their doubleheader against the Toronto Blue Jays; he did not make an appearance in that game and was optioned back to Columbus the next day. Clement was recalled by the Indians on June 13, 2021. He made his major league debut that same day as a pinch hitter against the Seattle Mariners, striking out in his first major league plate appearance.

On June 27, 2022, Clement became the first position player to pitch for Cleveland since Mike Freeman on June 29, 2019. He appeared in 64 games for Cleveland in 2022, hitting .200/.264/.221 with no home runs and 6 RBI. Clement was designated for assignment on September 21, 2022.

Oakland Athletics
Clement was claimed off waivers by the Oakland Athletics on September 23, 2022. He appeared in 6 games for Oakland, going 1-for-18 with a double. On December 13, Clement was designated for assignment following the signings of Aledmys Díaz and Jace Peterson. He cleared waivers and was sent outright to the Triple-A Las Vegas Aviators on December 16. Clement was released by the Athletics on March 12, 2023.

Toronto Blue Jays
On March 14, 2023, Clement signed a minor league contract with the Toronto Blue Jays organization.

References

External links

Virginia Cavaliers bio

1996 births
Living people
Akron RubberDucks players
Baseball players from New York (state)
Cleveland Guardians players
Cleveland Indians players
Columbus Clippers players
Harwich Mariners players
Lake County Captains players
Lynchburg Hillcats players
Mahoning Valley Scrappers players
Major League Baseball shortstops
Mesa Solar Sox players
Oakland Athletics players
Sportspeople from Rochester, New York
Virginia Cavaliers baseball players